M'Drắk is a rural district (huyện) of Đắk Lắk province in the Central Highlands region of Vietnam. As of 2003 the district had a population of 56,887, rising to 71,128 in 2018. The district covers an area of 1,348 km2. The district capital lies at M'Đrăk.  
M'Đrăk is one of the most remote districts of Đắk Lắk. In the east of the province is Phoenix Pass, which connects Đắk Lắk with Khánh Hòa. The district borders the districts of Ea Kars and Krông Bông, as well as the provinces of Phú Yên and Khánh Hòa.

Ethnicity
The main ethnic groups in the district are: Êđê, Tày, Nùng, M'nong, Dao and Thái. Kinh people constitute over 50% of the population.

Administration
M'Đrăk district has 13 administrative units, which includes the communes of:
 M'Drắk township
 Ea Pil
 Cư M'Ta
 Krông Á
 Cư Króa
 Ea H'Mlay
 Ea M'doal
 Ea Riêng
 Ea Trang
 Krông Jing
 Ea Lai
 Cư Prao
 Cư San

Nature
Most areas of the district consists of the M'Đrăk plateau. Here, abundant forest resources stand on most of the Highlands that are convenient for large pasture cattle breeding. M'Đrăk is a name familiar to many people by mentioning Vietnam Hey, a song by the musician Nguyễn Cường.

M'Đrăk is located in a tropical monsoon climate, although the annual average temperature is quite low compared to other regions, the average amount of sunshine per year is 1700 hours, and the average annual rainfall is 2500 mm.

M'Đrăk has a small intensive coffee industry. It also has specialties such as avocado, durian, jackfruit, litchi and many kinds of crops such as sugar, green beans and corn.

There are breeding areas for animals such as cows, goats and horses within the district.

Places such as the Phoenix Pass, Mt Hope and the waterfalls of Đray K'nao and Ea M'doal are also located here.

References

Districts of Đắk Lắk province